The Relief Society Documents Project is a project by the Church of Jesus Christ of Latter-day Saints (LDS Church) to publish historical documents regarding the history of the church's organization for women, the Relief Society.

In February 2016, the book The First Fifty Years of Relief Society: Key Documents in Latter-day Saint Women's History was published by Church Historian's Press, an imprint of the Church History Department of the LDS Church.

See also

Relief Society Magazine
Mormon feminism

Notes

References
 "Relief Society History Chronicled in New Book", mormonnewsroom.org, 19 February 2016. 
 Tad Walch, "Women hired by LDS Church History Department making huge strides in Mormon women's history", Deseret News, 7 February 2016.

19th-century documents
2016 non-fiction books
History books about the Latter Day Saint movement
History of the Latter Day Saint movement
LDS non-fiction
Mormon studies
2016 in Christianity
Relief Society